Corinne Le Quéré  (born July 1966) is a French-Canadian scientist. She is Royal Society Research Professor of Climate Change Science at the University of East Anglia (UEA) and former Director of Tyndall Centre for Climate Change Research. She is the chair of the French High Council on Climate and member of the UK Climate Change Committee. Her research focuses on the interactions between the carbon cycle and climate change.

Education
Le Quéré received her B.Sc. in physics from University of Montreal, an M.S. in Atmospheric and Oceanic Sciences from McGill University, and a Ph.D. in oceanography from University of Paris VI.

Personal & Early Life 
Le Quéré was born in Quebec during 1967 and as a child spent her camping holidays in the national parks of Eastern Canada which fostered her interest in the natural world. She left high school in 1984 and enrolled  for a course in general studies in a small university near to her home in Gatineau prior to transferring to the University of Montreal to study physics.

She later became a British Citizen and holds both French and Canadian  passports and is mother to her daughter, named Solo.

On 3 February 2023, Le Quéré was a guest on BBC's Desert Island Discs on Radio 4 (presented by Lauren Laverne). As an imaginary Castaway she chose a mask and snorkel as her luxury items and, for her favourite disc, La Vida Es Un Carnaval by Celia Cruz. For her book, she chose World Atlas of the Oceans by Dave Monahan.

Career and research
She was co-chair of the Global Carbon Project (GCP) from 2009 until 2013.  Within the GCP, she initiated and directed for over a decade the annual publication of the Global Carbon Budget. During 2014-2017 she has been a member of the Scientific Committee of the Future Earth platform for sustainability research. She is author of the 3rd, 4th and 5th assessment reports of the Intergovernmental Panel on Climate Change. She conducted research at Princeton University in the US (1992–1996), at the Max Planck Institute for Biogeochemistry in Germany (2000–2005), and jointly between the UEA and the British Antarctic Survey in the UK (2005–2010).

Honours and awards

In 2012, Le Quéré was awarded the Claude Berthault award from the French Academy of Sciences, the first Copernicus medal of the Copernicus Gesellschaft e.V. in 2013/2014, and was the annual Bolin lecturer in Stockholm University in 2014.

In 2015, she received a Blaise Pascal Medal for Earth and Environmental Sciences from the European Academy of Sciences and the Grande Médaille Albert 1er de Monaco, Science section.

In 2016, Le Quéré was elected a Fellow of the Royal Society.

In 2016, she was listed among the 20 "women making waves in the climate change debate" on the Road to Paris.

In 2019, Le Quéré was appointed Commander of the Order of the British Empire (CBE) in the 2019 Birthday Honours for services to climate change science.

In 2020, she received the Heineken Prize for Environmental Sciences for her interdisciplinary research on the interactions between climate change and the carbon cycle.

Selected publications
A full list of Le Quéré's peer-reviewed publications can be found on her Publons profile.
 Fossil CO2 emissions in the post-COVID-19 era (2021). Le Quéré, C. et al., Nature Climate Change, 11, 197–199, https://doi.org/10.1038/s41558-021-01001-0.
 Temporary reduction in daily global CO2 emissions during the COVID-19 forced confinement (2020). Le Quéré, C. et al., Nature Climate Change, 10, 647–653, https://doi.org/10.1038/s41558-020-0797-x.
 Global Carbon Budget 2020 (2020). Friedlingstein et al., 12, 3269–3340, https://essd.copernicus.org/articles/12/3269/2020/.
 Drivers of declining CO2 emissions in 18 developed economies (2019). Le Quéré, C. et al., Nature Climate Change, 5, 213-217, https://rdcu.be/bor0g.
 Decadal trends in the ocean carbon sink (2019). DeVries, T., C. Le Quéré, et al., PNAS, 118, 11646-11651, https://doi.org/10.1073/pnas.1900371116.
 Role of zooplankton dynamics for Southern Ocean phytoplankton biomass and global biogeochemical cycles (2016). Le Quéré, C. et al., Biogeosciences, 23, 4111-4133, https://doi.org/10.5194/bg-13-4111-2016.
 Trends in the sources and sinks of carbon dioxide (2009). Le Quéré, C. et al., Nature Geoscience, 6, 831-836, https://doi.org/10.1038/ngeo689.

References

External links
 The life scientific: Corinne Le Quéré on the global carbon cycle, BBC, 2019.
 Inside the mind of a climate change scientist, TEDxWarwick, April 2019.

1966 births
Living people
Université de Montréal alumni
McGill University Faculty of Science alumni
Pierre and Marie Curie University alumni
Academics of the University of East Anglia
Intergovernmental Panel on Climate Change lead authors
Canadian climatologists
Women climatologists
Fellows of the Royal Society
Female Fellows of the Royal Society
Commanders of the Order of the British Empire
Chevaliers of the Légion d'honneur
Canadian expatriates in England
French Quebecers
Canadian Fellows of the Royal Society